The Federal Bureau of Prisons (BOP) operates or contracts with a variety of facilities in California, including United States Penitentiaries (USPs), Federal Correctional Institutions (FCIs), and Private Correctional Institutions (PCIs). Informally, these would all often be described as federal prisons.

As of April 2020, 13,315 people were under custody in BOP facilities in California. An additional 422 people were under BOP custody in privately-run facilities in California, and an unspecified number of people were under BOP custody in community-based facilities in California. Roughly 8% of the people in BOP custody are in California.

For comparison, the March 2020 California Department of Corrections and Rehabilitation (CDCR) population report described 182,579 people under CDCR control.

BOP facilities are separate from immigration detention facilities operated by U.S. Immigration and Customs Enforcement (ICE).

United States Penitentiaries (USPs) in California

USPs are high-security institutions.

 United States Penitentiary, Atwater
 United States Penitentiary, Lompoc
 United States Penitentiary, Victorville

Federal correctional institutions (FCIs) in California

FCIs are low- or medium-security institutions.

 Federal Correctional Institution, Dublin 
 Federal Correctional Institution, Herlong
 Federal Correctional Institution, Lompoc
 Federal Correctional Institution, Mendota
 Federal Correctional Institution, Terminal Island
 Federal Correctional Institution, Victorville Medium I
 Federal Correctional Institution, Victorville Medium II

Private Correctional Institutions (CIs) in California

Private CIs are contracted by BOP to be operated by a private corporation.

 Taft Correctional Institution run by Management and Training Corporation (MCT)

Federal Correctional Complexes (FCCs) in California

A correctional complex consists of multiple facilities that share some resources.

 Federal Correctional Complex, Lompoc (FCI Lompoc + USP Lompoc)
 Federal Correctional Complex, Victorville (FCI Victorville Medium I + FCI Victorville Medium II + USP Victorville)

Residential Reentry Management (RRM) field offices in California

Per the BOP, RRMs "administer contracts for community-based programs and serve as the Federal Bureau of Prisons local liaison with the federal courts, the U.S. Marshals Service, state and local corrections, and a variety of community groups within their specific judicial districts. RRM Staff also monitor local Residential Reentry Centers which are responsible for providing federal offenders with community-based services that will assist with their reentry needs." Residential Reentry Centers, informally called halfway houses, are facilities run by private companies contracted by BOP.

 RRM Long Beach
 RRM Sacramento

See also
 Incarceration in California

References

External links
 Federal Bureau of Prisons list of locations

Prisons